The 2011 Miami-Dade County mayoral special election took place on May 24, 2011 and June 28, 2011 after the recall of County Mayor Carlos Álvarez earlier that year. After a May 24 first round, former County Commissioner Carlos A. Giménez narrowly defeated Hialeah Mayor Julio Robaina in a June 28 runoff. The election was officially nonpartisan.

Candidates
Carlos A. Giménez, County commissioner and former City of Miami Fire chief
Julio Robaina, Mayor of Hialeah
Marcelo Llorente, former state representative district 116
Luther Campbell, rapper
Roosevelt Bradley, businessman and member of the Miami-Dade Transit 
Jose "Pepe" Cancio, County Commission 
Jefferey Lampert 
Gabrielle Redfern, candidate for Miami Beach City commission
Wilbur "Short Stop" Bell, Candidate for Dade County Commission district 3
Eddie Lewis, candidate Miami Dade County Property Appraiser in 2008
Farid Khavari, economist and gubernatorial candidate in 2010

First round results

References

2011 special
Miami-Dade County mayoral special
Miami-Dade County mayoral special
Miami Dade County mayoral special election, 2011